Events from the year 1515 in Ireland.

Incumbent
Lord: Henry VIII

Events

Births
Margaret Ball, died of deprivation in the dungeons of Dublin Castle, beatified in 1992 (d. 1584)

Deaths
August 3 – Thomas Butler, 7th Earl of Ormonde (b. c. 1450)

References

 
1510s in Ireland
Ireland
Years of the 16th century in Ireland